Li Ying (died 169) was a lineal descendant of Li Er (李耳), commonly thought to be Laozi's real name.  Li Ying was governor of Henan Commandery. He was involved in a Partisan Prohibitions case and was killed in the second case.

See also
Disasters of Partisan Prohibitions

References
 

Year of birth missing
169 deaths